Raymond Fellay (16 January 1932 – 29 May 1994) was a Swiss alpine skier who competed in the 1956 Winter Olympics. He was born in Verbier.

In 1956 he won the silver medal in the Alpine downhill event. In the slalom competition he finished eleventh and in the giant slalom contest he finished 27th.

References
 Raymond Fellay's profile at Sports Reference.com

1932 births
1994 deaths
Swiss male alpine skiers
Olympic alpine skiers of Switzerland
Alpine skiers at the 1956 Winter Olympics
Olympic silver medalists for Switzerland
Olympic medalists in alpine skiing
Medalists at the 1956 Winter Olympics